Miette Hot Springs are commercially developed hot springs in Jasper National Park in Alberta, Canada, near Jasper.  The pool is outdoors and offers visitors a view of the surrounding Fiddle River Valley.  The hot springs are at the end of a 15 km seasonal road and are located 61 km northeast of Jasper.  Water temperature is kept at approximately

References

External links 
Miette Hot Springs
Parks Canada website

Jasper National Park
Hot springs of Alberta